Negarman (also Romanized as Negārman, Nekārman, Nigārman, Nogārīmān, Nogārman, and Nokārman) is a village in Kharqan Rural District, Bastam District, Shahrud County, Semnan Province, Iran. At the 2006 census, its population was 69, in 23 families.

References 

Populated places in Shahrud County